Massariosphaeria is a genus of fungi in the family Lophiostomataceae.

Species
Massariosphaeria adrianii
Massariosphaeria alpigena
Massariosphaeria autumnalis
Massariosphaeria clavispora
Massariosphaeria compositarum
Massariosphaeria erucacea
Massariosphaeria grandispora
Massariosphaeria massarioides
Massariosphaeria megaspora
Massariosphaeria melicae
Massariosphaeria moricola
Massariosphaeria mosana
Massariosphaeria multiseptata
Massariosphaeria pakistana
Massariosphaeria palustris
Massariosphaeria phaeospora
Massariosphaeria pusillispora
Massariosphaeria roumeguerei
Massariosphaeria scabrispora
Massariosphaeria scirpina
Massariosphaeria thurgoviensis
Massariosphaeria triseptata
Massariosphaeria typhicola
Massariosphaeria vitalbae

References

External links
Index Fungorum

Lophiostomataceae